Mary Josephine Benson (born Trotter; March 20, 1887August 31, 1965) was a Canadian poet and journalist.

Life 
Benson was originally from Port Hope, Ontario. She worked in journalism and advertising in Toronto in the 1910s, and returned to Port Hope following her marriage in 1915.

A report on a reading she gave in 1931 described her voice as "charmingly musical".

Writing 
A 1922 review described her only published collection My Pocket Beryl as "real, personal and authentic poetry, of the present era". Among the works collected in My Pocket Beryl is a prose poem about Christmas.

In 1931, she received a $25 prize for her poem "The Bitter Lover", awarded "for the best short poem on any subject by a British subject residing in Canada". Andrew Macphail selected her poem as the winner.

In addition to My Pocket Beryl, Benson published individual poems in newspapers and magazines including Maclean's and The Globe (now The Globe and Mail).

Works

Further reading

Notes

External links 

 
 

1887 births
1965 deaths
20th-century Canadian journalists
Canadian women poets
Writers from Ontario
20th-century Canadian women writers
20th-century Canadian poets